Mycetaea is a genus of beetles in the family Mycetaeidae. There is at least one described species in Mycetaea, M. subterranea.

References

External links

 

Coccinelloidea genera
Articles created by Qbugbot